Jax Briggs is a fictional character in the Mortal Kombat fighting game franchise by Midway Games and NetherRealm Studios. Introduced in Mortal Kombat II (1993) as the leader of a Special Forces unit, he became a mainstay of the series, including as the protagonist of the action-adventure spin-off Mortal Kombat: Special Forces (2000). The character is distinguished by his metal bionic arms, which he first received in Mortal Kombat 3 (1995), and his abilities are based around his upper-body strength.

In the games, Jax is first depicted as the commanding officer of American Special Forces operative Sonya Blade and subsequently becomes one of the warriors defending Earthrealm from various threats. He is also depicted as a primary hero in various related media, including the 1996 animated series Mortal Kombat: Defenders of the Realm, the 1997 film Mortal Kombat: Annihilation, and the 2011 web series Mortal Kombat: Legacy. Reception to the character has been generally positive for his appearance and special moves.

Appearances

Mortal Kombat games
Major Jackson "Jax" Briggs makes his first chronological appearance in the 2000 action-adventure game Mortal Kombat: Special Forces, in which he attempts to stop Kano and the Black Dragon crime organization from stealing an artifact capable of opening portals to other realms.

Jax's first game appearance came in Mortal Kombat II (1993), where he is on a mission to find his Special Forces partner, Lieutenant Sonya Blade, who had gone missing in Outworld while attempting to apprehend Kano. Though he succeeds in rescuing Sonya, Kano manages to evade capture.

When Outworld emperor Shao Kahn invades Earthrealm in Mortal Kombat 3 (1995), Jax is among the thunder god Raiden's chosen warriors to help save Earthrealm; preparing for battle by fitting his arms with metallic bionic implants. After helping foil Shao Kahn's attempt to permanently claim Earth as his own, Jax and Sonya found the Outer World Investigation Agency (OIA), which specializes in exploring and mapping other realms as well as the destruction of interdimensional portals that could lead to Earth.

In Mortal Kombat 4 (1997), Jax and Sonya arrest Black Dragon member, Jarek, but they all end up joining forces with other Earthrealm heroes to stop fallen Elder God Shinnok and his Netherealm forces. After witnessing Jarek attack Sonya, Jax saves her and throws him over a cliff. While returning to Earthrealm, Jax and Sonya find the malfunctioning Lin Kuei cyborg Cyrax stranded in a desert, and bring him back to the OIA headquarters, where they restore his humanity and recruit him as an agent of the Special Forces.

In Mortal Kombat: Deadly Alliance (2002), Sonya and Jax have added the blind swordsman Kenshi into their ranks, but the OIA's underground facility is destroyed by Hsu Hao, who reveals himself to be part of the evil Red Dragon clan; bitter rivals of the Black Dragon. When Hsu Hao is later sent by Red Dragon leader Mavado to kill the sorcerer Shang Tsung, Jax intercepts and kills him. However, in the battle against the titular Deadly Alliance of Shang Tsung and Quan Chi, Jax and his allies are killed and resurrected by the Dragon King Onaga to become his slaves.

While Jax is not playable in Mortal Kombat: Deception (2004), he plays a minor role in the storyline when Shao Kahn's enforcer Ermac and the spirit of Liu Kang break Onaga's mind control over Jax and his comrades.

In Mortal Kombat: Armageddon (2006), in which Jax becomes playable again, Sonya sends Jax to lead a unit in search of survivors after destroying Sektor's Tekunin warship, but they later vanish and are captured by Sektor's cyber ninjas.

Jax is one of the eleven characters representing Mortal Kombat in the non-canonical 2008 crossover fighting game Mortal Kombat vs. DC Universe. In his ending, he underwent further mechanization to increase his power, though at the cost of his humanity.

In the 2011 Mortal Kombat game, which is a reboot of the first three games, Jax is present at the start of the Shaolin Tournament and works with Sonya to bring down the Black Dragon. While they succeed in seizing many of their weapons caches, the Special Forces' key informant, Kano, is discovered to be a high-powered member of the organization, causing Jax and Sonya to focus on Kano's capture following the deaths of many of their comrades. This leads them to the Mortal Kombat tournament on Shang Tsung's uncharted island, where Jax is captured and imprisoned, forcing Sonya to participate in the tournament to spare his life. Raiden later enables Sonya to free a wounded Jax, but Shang Tsung destroys their extraction transport, stranding them on the island. Raiden reappears to heal Jax's injuries, which makes Sonya and Jax aware of both his presence and their crucial role in defending Earthrealm alongside Raiden's other chosen warriors. After Liu Kang's victory over Shang Tsung, Sonya is held captive in Outworld before being rescued by Jax, who does not take part in the second tournament after his arms are psychically obliterated in a confrontation with Ermac and he is transported back to Earthrealm for medical attention. Sonya and Jax, now with newly outfitted cybernetic arms, reunite with the other Earthrealm warriors to repel Shao Kahn's invasion of Earthrealm. While Raiden and Liu Kang commune with the Elder Gods, the Lin Kuei ninja clan and Shao Kahn's wife Sindel attack. While Sonya survives, Jax is killed and resurrected by Quan Chi in the Netherealm as one of his undead revenant slaves.

Jax returns as a playable character in Mortal Kombat X. Two years after he was enslaved by Quan Chi, Raiden and Sonya manage to resurrect him. Due to his traumatic experience as a revenant, he retires from the Special Forces, marries a woman named Vera, and becomes a farmer. A further twenty years later, his adult daughter Jacqui followed in his footsteps and joined the Special Forces alongside Cassie Cage, the daughter of Sonya and Johnny Cage; albeit against her father's initial wishes, though he eventually came around to support her. Jax, Sareena, and Kenshi are assigned to capture Quan Chi in the Netherrealm to use him to revive their friends. He loses most of his men in the battle, but soon captures Quan Chi and transports him to Earthrealm.

Jax returns in Mortal Kombat 11. Two years after the previous game, Jax has secluded himself on his farm following Vera's death and his honorable discharge from the Special Forces. After Kronika, the keeper of time, fractures the timeline in an attempt to start anew, a younger version of Jax gets brought to the present. She also recruits the present Jax to her side after promising him a new life in her new era, which brings him into conflict with Jacqui and his younger self. While leading an attack on Kronika's keep, Raiden encourages the present Jax to fight for Earthrealm once more after telling him Kronika is Shinnok's mother. In the DLC story expansion Aftermath, a time-travelling Fujin helps bring the present Jax to his senses, leading to him abandoning Kronika's cause before the final battle.

Character design and gameplay
Jax was originally named "Kurtis Stryker," and was to be in the roster of the inaugural 1992 first game of the franchise while possessing the storyline of pursuing Kano and his entrapment on Shang Tsung's island. The character was ultimately postponed upon the developers' realization that there were no female fighters in the game, which resulted in Sonya Blade taking his place instead and inheriting much of his originally intended storyline. Stryker was officially added into Mortal Kombat II, where he was the first character made for the game, but renamed "Jax" during the development process. Daniel Pesina stated Jax was "actually modeled after Power Man. So we took all these Marvel comic book ideas, we put them into the game, and now it’s owned by Warner Brothers, who owns DC."

Played by bodybuilder John Parrish, Jax was originally conceived for the game as a kickboxer dressed in shorts and a headband, but this concept was nixed due to potential similarities to Street Fighter's boxer character Balrog. Jax was then outfitted in a yellow gi with metal forearms that clanged upon impact. Digitized game footage of the character in the costume was shot over two days, during which Parrish accidentally split the pants. The design was aborted thereafter by the developers as they felt the character did not look big enough, so Parrish was called back by Midway several months later for a re-shoot, for which he went shirtless with simple black tights. For Mortal Kombat 3, he had Jax's bionic implants painted onto his arms, a process that took six hours.

In early development screenshots of Mortal Kombat 5 (which would become Deadly Alliance) released to the public in 2001, Jax was seen facing off against Scorpion while wearing his MK3 costume, but he was given a complete makeover for the finished product with a military-themed outfit consisting of a red beret, sunglasses, and green combat trousers, in addition to a bandolier worn across his chest and a submachine gun that he used in the game as a weapon. Jax wore a green bandana on his head for MK: Special Forces, while in MK vs. DC Universe and the 2011 reboot, he sported a pair of dog tags around his neck. Jax has gone shirtless in all iterations of his main costumes in the Mortal Kombat fighting games, with the exception of MKvsDC, in which he was fully clothed with no skin exposed save for his head and face, and his bionics were adorned with green LED lights.

Mortal Kombat X featured DLC costumes centered around the original Predator film. Jax in particular received an alternate outfit that made him look like one of the main characters, Al Dillon. If this costume is selected, he is voiced by Dillon's actor, Carl Weathers.

Jax was widely seen as a top-tier character of Mortal Kombat II. He was considered as such by GamePro in their 1993 character rankings, in which they placed him second out of the game's twelve playables behind Mileena: "It’s hard to fight against a good Jax [player] that knows how to control space and use his projectile well." According to CU Amiga, Jax was "the best all-round character," but "not quite as nimble on his feet as [the] other characters." Sega Visions opined that Jax "had the best offense" in the game, while "his slow movement and less-than-powerful uppercut are his weaknesses." According to Total 64,  Jax in Mortal Kombat Trilogy is "just the same as he was in MK3, which isn't a bad thing at all. A top fighter, that is equally good in the air as on the ground."

Prima Games' official guide for Mortal Kombat: Armageddon rated Jax overall a 6 out of 10 as "a borderline low-tier character type." According to Alex Vo of GameSpy, he was a "versatile" character but his tonfa weapon style in the game had "no range," while he was best utilized only in distant or up-close combat. In Prima's official guide for the 2011 Mortal Kombat reboot, Jax "has generally changed over the years from a defensive machine to an offensive powerhouse," and displays no particular advantage over other characters but is very disadvantaged when playing against Shang Tsung. The publisher additionally considered Jax from MKII to be one of the "cheapest" Mortal Kombat characters, citing his specials such as his unblockable "Ground Pound" and "Quadruple Slam" while opining that the first game had no such unblockable specials but "that line of sensible thinking was thrown out the window when Mortal Kombat 2 came around."

Other media

Film and television
While Jax's authority-figure role is unchanged in alternate Mortal Kombat media, events leading up to his receiving the bionics have varied. He makes a brief appearance in the 1995 film Mortal Kombat, accompanying Sonya on a raid on a Hong Kong discothèque in an unsuccessful attempt to capture Kano, and later vainly tries to stop Sonya from pursuing Kano after he baits her into boarding Shang Tsung's ship en route to the tournament. Steve James was originally cast as Jax, but after he died from pancreatic cancer in December 1993, the role went to Gregory McKinney, who had a military background prior to becoming an actor, and his name was misspelled as "Jaxx" in the closing credits.

Jax was a main character in the 1995 theatrical show Mortal Kombat: Live Tour, where he was played by Hakim Alston (who had a small role in the first film), Shah Alston, and Tyrone Wiggins (Rain in the second film). He joined Shang Tsung, Ermac, Scorpion, and Raiden in a 2014 Mortal Kombat parody animation produced by Comedy Central, in which he was renamed "Leroy Smax" and seen rejecting a request over the phone from "Yao Zhang" (Shang Tsung) to compete in his secret underground tournament, while at home playing a video game dressed only in his underwear and bionic arms.

Jax was a starring character in the 1996 animated series Mortal Kombat: Defenders of the Realm, where he was portrayed as a cool-minded character who was regularly in an amiable mood, which sometimes clashed with Raiden's dry, sarcastic personality. He was voiced by Dorian Harewood, and his bionics were again removable while functional by way of a set of control chips. In the noncanonical plot of one episode, Jax becomes romantically involved with a female ninja named Ruby, who is secretly working with Shao Kahn in his attempt to trap the Earth defenders in Outworld.

He was among the many main characters recast for the 1997 sequel Mortal Kombat: Annihilation, in which he was played by former American Gladiators actor Lynn Red Williams that sees him bewildered at occurring supernatural events following Shao Kahn's invasion of Earth. Jax is first seen on an operating table inside a medical facility, with his implants ("cybernetic strength enhancers") already in place without explanation, and the only indication of his military rank is when he introduces himself to Jade as "Major Jackson Briggs." Jax and Sonya fight, and defeat, Cyrax and one of Kahn's extermination squads inside the facility, but they later come into conflict with one another due to Sonya's sustained grief over Johnny Cage's earlier death and her refusal to fill Jax in on the details of the Earthrealmers' mission, and they temporarily split apart as a result. They ultimately reunite with Liu Kang and Kitana and succeed in stopping Kahn from bringing Earth to ruin.

In Kevin Tancharoen's 2010 short film Mortal Kombat: Rebirth, and the 2011 Mortal Kombat: Legacy web series, Michael Jai White played Jax as a police detective in the fictional location of Deacon City. In the first and second episodes, he and Stryker lead a SWAT team in a raid on Kano and the Black Dragon's warehouse to find and rescue Sonya. Jax confronts and fights Kano, during which he punches Kano forcefully enough to detach his right eye, but his arms are then severely damaged after he saves Sonya from an offscreen grenade explosion. White said in a 2011 interview with MTV that he was originally to play Jax in the first Mortal Kombat film, but he turned it down in order to star in HBO's 1995 Mike Tyson biopic. He was again cast as Jax in Annihilation before ultimately dropping out upon being cast in the title role of Spawn.

Ike Amadi voices the character in Mortal Kombat Legends: Scorpion's Revenge and the sequel Mortal Kombat Legends: Battle of the Realms.

Mehcad Brooks portrays Jax in the 2021 reboot film Mortal Kombat.

Literature
Jax had an expanded role in the novelization of the first film, which included a detailed opening scene of a joint operation of arresting Black Dragon members by the Special Forces and an international task force that goes south after Kano kills the task force's lieutenant. After Sonya's disappearance following her boarding of the ship, Jax works with his unit to find her, including consulting a wizened fighting-tournament expert at Liu Kang's Shaolin temple. When the Earthrealmers return home victorious at the conclusion, Jax reunites with Sonya and they arrest Kano.

He is a featured character in the 1994 Midway-produced Mortal Kombat II comic book that was written and illustrated by series co-creator John Tobias and used to set up the events leading to the second tournament. Jax is first seen interrogating Johnny Cage about Sonya's whereabouts in the wake of the violent aftermath of Liu Kang's victory over Shang Tsung in the Shaolin Tournament and disbelieves Cage's revelation that Sonya and Kano had teamed up in fending off Goro, but after Sonya (with Kano) contacts Jax from Outworld, Jax realizes Cage was telling the truth and tracks him down at a movie studio, but Shao Kahn's forces have already invaded Earth and Jax ends up battling Kintaro in an inconclusive fight before Liu Kang and Kung Lao intervene. He was given a Special Forces partner named Beran, created exclusively for the comic and modeled after Midway art director Steve Beran; he is killed near the conclusion by Mileena off-panel. Jax has only a single-panel cameo in the special-edition Mortal Kombat 4 comic packaged with the 1998 PC release of the game, contacting Sonya by radio as she pursues Jarek.

In Malibu Comics' Mortal Kombat comic series, Jax first appears with other MKII characters in the September–November 1994 "Goro: Prince of Pain" three-issue miniseries, which tied into the 1994 "Blood & Thunder" six-issue story arc. Like in the game, he is on a mission to find the missing Sonya, starting by confronting Shang Tsung on his island before Tsung transports him to Outworld. Jax eventually reunites with her and they apprehend Kano at the "Tournament Edition" conclusion of both storylines. In the miniseries U.S. Special Forces, released in two parts in January and February 1995, he and Sonya work to capture an original Black Dragon character named Rojack. Jax then featured in the six-part "Battlewave" miniseries that year, where he is brutally attacked by Goro and left in a coma, but awakens to take out Jade and Smoke when they attempt to assassinate him in the hospital. After Sonya is abducted by Kintaro while returning to Shang Tsung's island to investigate the attack on Jax, Jax himself joins Cage on a plane bound for Outworld, where they again thwart an attack by Jade and Smoke by way of Jax blowing Smoke (transformed into pure smoke) out through a hole in the plane. He and the Earthrealmers then succeed in breaking up a wedding between a brainwashed Sonya and Shao Kahn. In the "Tournament Edition II" wrap-up of the miniseries, Jax's arms are severely damaged by Baraka, setting up the plot for the implants, but this was never explored as the series was canceled in August 1995, shortly after the issue was released.

Merchandise and promotion
An action figure of Jax was released by Toy Island in 1996 as part of their Mortal Kombat Trilogy line. He and Reptile were featured in an "X-Ray" pack of two six-inch figures with transparent upper bodies that were based on the 2011 reboot and produced by Jazwares. The company also released a four-inch Jax figure in 2012 that was packaged with an Uzi submachine gun (which was not in the game), but the figure was discontinued after only several months in release. Jax was one of twenty series characters featured on 2.5" x 3.5" collectible magnets by Ata-Boy Wholesale in 2011.

Reception
The character has received positive reception, though mostly for his design from Mortal Kombat 3 and onward. Jax placed tenth in UGO's 2012 list of the top fifty Mortal Kombat characters. Den of Geek ranked him 27th in their 2015 rating of the series' 64 playable characters for his role as the "cool as hell ... super-strong Army dude," while his "Mortal Kombat 4 ending is memorable for all the wrong reasons." Anthony Severino of Game Revolution ranked Jax eighth in his 2003 selection of the "Top 10 Old-School Mortal Kombat Characters," Armando Rodriguez of 411mania.com placed Jax seventh in his 2011 selection of the best Mortal Kombat characters. However, GameFront called him "a character no one cares about," and while Game Rant ranked him tenth on the list of the "ten most awesome" series characters in 2011, labeling his "Gotcha Grab" and "Air Back Breaker" specials from Mortal Kombat II as two of the "most satisfying moves from the original trilogy," they described his design therein as "a third-tier WWE star in tight Lycra pants." Shea Serrano of Grantland rated Jax last (twelfth) in his 20th-anniversary ranking of the Mortal Kombat II roster: "What a dud ... He was supposed to be a military bro but did exactly zero cool military-bro shit." Dustin Thomas of Destructoid ranked the MKII version of Jax fifth in his 2014 selection of the five worst series characters ("a generic black guy with a mustache and a muscle-gut"), citing his cybernetic arms as his only distinctive feature.

Finishing moves
Reaction to Jax's Fatalities has been more mixed. His "Arm Rip" from Mortal Kombat II was voted by the readers of GamePro as the best Mortal Kombat finishing move in 1995. IGN, in 2006, named it as the tenth best gore effect in video game history, and Thomas called it the character's "one redeeming quality" in MKII. Complex ranked his "Head Clap" Fatality from the game as the 14th best finishing move in the series: "Jax did to opponents' heads what Gallagher does to watermelons." His "Giant Stomp" from Mortal Kombat 3, in which he grows off-screen to a gargantuan height and then crushes his opponent with his foot, was included in IGN's 2010 ranking of their "Unofficial Top 10 List" of the best series finishers, but made GamePro's 2008 list of the 12 "LAMEST" Fatalities: "If you have the ability to grow to 200 feet tall, you should probably unleash it at the beginning of a battle instead of the end." Game Informer rated the "Arm Rip" among their picks of the series' best Fatalities, but included the "Giant Stomp" among the "most confusing." CJ Smillie of Game Rant ranked his "Three Points" Fatality from the 2011 Mortal Kombat reboot as the ninth best from that game: "It’s simple, it looks devastatingly brutal, and it’s creative to boot." None of his finishers made Prima Games' 2014 listing of the series' top fifty Fatalities. Kevin Wong of WhatCulture named his "T-Wrecks" from Mortal Kombat X as the game's top "disgusting" Fatality ("Jax ... lights a cigar, rips open his opponent’s face along the jaw, and stubs out his cigar on the spurting mouth wound. It doesn’t get any more demeaning and objectifying than that").

Jax has received negative attention for his Mortal Kombat 4 ending. Cracked included it in their 2013 feature "6 Video Game Endings That Are Clearly F#@%ing With Us," saying of Jarek's pleading for his life as Jax dangles him over the cliff precipice, "What follows is one of the stupidest exchanges I can remember in a video game. ... It's hard to put into words just how bad that acting is." In 2010, 4thletter.net listed the MK4 endings, exemplified with the Nintendo 64 version of Jax's ending, among the "Top Ten Ridiculous Things to Come out of Mortal Kombat," and ranked it 19th in their 2013 countdown of the top fighting game endings. "Jax easily has the best, especially since it’s an extension of Jarek’s ending, which is sort of an extension of Sonya’s ending. ... It's so beautifully shitty." Robert Naytor of Hardcore Gaming 101 remarked, "Not every ending [in the game] is quite to that level of masterful writing." Smosh rated it among their six "Worst Endings in Video Game History."

Characterization and portrayal
Complex included Jax among the fifty greatest soldiers in video games, placing him at 47th in 2013.

Meagan Marie of Game Informer named him among the "biggest beefcakes" in video gaming in 2009, alongside the likes of Duke Nukem and Kratos. In a 2008 feature on the stereotyping of African-American characters in video games, The Escapist criticized the "ridiculous" attributes of black characters from "violent" fighting games, citing as examples Jax's "Machine Gun" special move (from Deadly Alliance and MK vs. DC Universe) and T.J. Combo's "Target Practice" finisher from Killer Instinct 2 in which he pulls out a gun and fatally shoots his opponent.

Ken Begg of Jabootu's Bad Movie Dimension praised Jax's portrayal in the first film in that he "spoke and acted like ... a highly trained and well-educated tactical police officer," but criticized him as "stereotypical street-black" in Mortal Kombat: Annihilation while opining that a scene therein of Sonya clashing with Jax about the Earthrealmers' mission "could easily be seen as an exchange between the audience and the screenwriters." Eric Snider of Film.com said of Williams' performance, "Since he’s The Black Guy, the movie makes him say things like 'That’s what I’m talkin’ about!' and 'Let's do this!'" Blair Marnell of CraveOnline praised White's performance in the first episode of Mortal Kombat: Legacy: "White really carries the piece as Jax ... this is a Jax that I can buy as a main character." IGN described White in the series as "doing what he does best—kicking some serious ass."

See also
United States Army Special Forces in popular culture

Notes

References

Amputee characters in video games
Black characters in video games
Cyborg characters in video games
Fictional African-American people
Fictional American people in video games
Fictional martial artists in video games
Fictional Muay Thai practitioners
Fictional United States Army Special Forces personnel
Fictional characters with post-traumatic stress disorder
Fictional farmers
Fictional fist-load fighters
Fictional gunfighters in video games
Fictional judoka
Fictional majors
Fictional military personnel in video games
Fictional police officers in video games
Fictional sport wrestlers
Fictional stick-fighters
Male characters in video games
Mortal Kombat characters
Video game characters introduced in 1993
Video game characters with superhuman strength
Video game protagonists